State Route 195  (SR 195) is part of Maine's system of numbered state highways. It travels from an intersection with Corea Road and Crowley Island Road in Corea to an intersection with U.S. Route 1 (US 1).

The route is notable due to not being renumbered or decommissioned after the Interstate Highway System was installed, as was the case with State Route 95.

Major junctions

References

External links

Floodgap Roadgap's RoadsAroundME: Maine State Route 195

195
Transportation in Hancock County, Maine